Khongsat (Kongsat), also called Suma, is a Loloish language of northern Laos.

Khongsat is spoken in Namo District, Oudomxai province, including in Sutko village (Kato 2008).

References

Sources 
Kato, Takashi. 2008. Linguistic Survey of Tibeto-Burman languages in Lao P.D.R. Tokyo: Institute for the Study of Languages and Cultures of Asia and Africa (ILCAA).

Southern Loloish languages
Languages of Laos